Charles Alfred Davis (12 February 1923 – 28 January 1999) was an English theologian and priest, and Professor of Theology at St Edmund's College, Ware, later Professor of Religious Studies at the University of Alberta. In 1966, he caused considerable controversy in both the Catholic and Anglican communities by publicly leaving the Catholic Church on the basis of what he said at the time was an "intellectual rejection of the Papacy."

Background 
Davis was born in Swindon to Charles Lionel Davis (1893–1968), a sign painter, and Agatha Ellen Lapham (1893–1979). He was raised as a Catholic and went to school at St. Brendan's Grammar School in Bristol (now St. Brendan's Sixth Form College).

Davis was ordained in 1946 and then had two years of graduate studies at the Pontifical Gregorian University in Rome. He taught at the seminary in St Edmund's Seminary, Ware from 1952 to 1965 and was the first Catholic to give the F. D. Maurice Lectures at King's College London, which were published in 1966 as God's Grace in History. He was also editor of Clergy Review (now The Pastoral Review). He received an appointment to Heythrop College, University of London, in 1965, where he remained for only 16 months.

Davis was a member of The New Churches Research Group (NCRG), a group of Catholic and Anglican church architects and craftspeople who promoted liturgical reform of churches though publications such as The Tablet and Architects' Journal. The group was co-founded by Peter Hammond and included architects Peter Gilbey, Robert Maguire, Keith Murray (an ecclesiastical designer), John Newton (Burles, Newton & Partners), George Pace, Patrick Nuttgens, Patrick Reyntiens (stained glass artist), Austin Winkley and Lance Wright.

Defection from the Church 
Davis announced that he was leaving the Catholic Church on 21 December 1966. The decision was widely publicised and caused the Observer to describe his actions as leaving a "crisis of authority" in the Church. The Catholic Herald described his defection from the Church as "a cause for sadness, not only for the church, the man himself, and those who admired him and his work, but because of the inevitable bitterness that invariably follows such a step," before suggesting that it would have been preferable if Davis had been quieter in his exit.

In an article circulated by Davis at the time of his public exit, he states that the Church had become too powerful and too dehumanising – "a vast, impersonal, unfree, and inhuman system," that it had been compromised by its connection with the Nazi regime. The article also argued that orthodoxy had limited Davis' intellectual horizons: "I have had to remove a mountain of ecclesiastical rubble in order to produce a few tiny plants of creative thought." Davis's exit from the Church was included in an autobiography published the following year titled A Question of Conscience. In 1967, Davis married Florence Henderson (not to be confused with the actress), a Brooklyn-born Catholic theology student and member of The Grail, a Catholic women's movement. In 2006, their daughter, Claire Henderson Davis stated that her father left the priesthood to marry her mother.

The theologian Herbert McCabe published a critique – albeit a sympathetic one – in the journal New Blackfriars. McCabe's editorial argued that leaving the Church because it was corrupt was unreasonable since the Church had always been corrupt. Davis's leaving the Church has been described as having the same effect on the Catholic Church in Britain as the publication of John A. T. Robinson's Honest to God had on Anglicanism. The philosopher Elizabeth Anscombe wrote to Davis letting him know that she was glad that he had left the Church, as she regarded his beliefs about the Eucharist as being contrary to Catholic teaching.

After defection 
He became Professor of Religious Studies at the University of Alberta in Edmonton. In 1970 he moved to Concordia University in Montreal to chair the Department of Religious Studies. He became the President of the Canadian Society for the Study of Religion.

In 1978, Davis gave the Hulsean Lectures at Cambridge University, which were published in 1980 as Theology and Political Society, which reflected his interest in the relation between religion and sociology. In 1995 a collection of essays titled The Promise of Critical Theology was published in Davis' honour.

In 1991, Davis retired and moved back to Britain, living in Edinburgh. In the last several years of his life he returned to the Catholic fold and received communion at Mass in Edinburgh and Cambridge. He suffered from Parkinson's disease and died in 1999.

Subsequent publications
In 1974, Davis published Temptations of Religion which identifies four temptations unique to religion. He calls these lust for certitude, pride of history, cosmic vanity, and anger of morality. In 1986, he published What is living, what is dead in Christianity today?: breaking the liberal-conservative deadlock.

References 

1923 births
1999 deaths
English theologians
Former Roman Catholics
Critics of the Catholic Church
British expatriates in Italy
British expatriates in Canada